Buck Ellison (born 1987) is an American visual artist, known for his photography. He lives and works in Los Angeles.

Biography
Buck Ellison was born in 1987 in San Francisco, California. He received a BA degree in German literature from Columbia University, in 2010; and an MFA degree from the Städelschule, Frankfurt am Main in 2014. 

Through collages, films, photographs, he produces a deep network of inquiry into how whiteness and privilege are sustained and broadcast.

Ellison has exhibited at the The Hammer Museum, and has been in group exhibitions including the 16th Lyon Biennial, 2022, the Whitney Biennial, Whitney Museum of American Art, 2022, Made in L.A. 2020: a version, The Hammer Museum, Los Angeles; The Huntington Libraries and Museum, Pasadena, 2020 (cat.), Antarctica, Kunsthalle Wien, Vienna, 2018 The Sun Placed In The Abyss, Columbus Museum of Art, Columbus, 2016 (cat.) among others.

His work has been reviewed in Aperture, Artforum, ArtReview, the British Journal of Photography, Flash Art, Kaleidoscope, Mousse magazine, The New Yorker, The New York Times, and Texte zur Kunst.

His first monograph, Living Trust, won the Paris Photo-Aperture Best PhotoBook Award 2020.

Collections
His work is in the museum collections of the Aïshti Foundation,  Los Angeles County Museum of Art (LACMA), and the Whitney Museum of American Art.

Bibliography
 Diehl, Travis, “Buck Ellison’s Great White Society,” The New York Times, 24 June 2022. 
 Griffin, Jonathan, “Buck Ellison’s American Freaks,” Art Review, 9 June 2022.
 Living Trust, Loose Joints, 2020 (monograph)

Awards and recognition
Paris Photo-Aperture Foundation PhotoBook Award, first PhotoBook winner (2020)

References

American artists
Columbia University alumni
1987 births
Living people
Artists from Los Angeles
Artists from San Francisco
Städelschule alumni